Family Health may refer to:

Family medicine
Family Health (magazine), an American health magazine
Family Health International renamed FHI 360, nonprofit human development organization based in North Carolina

See also
Family Health Care Decisions Act